Molly Neuman (born June 18, 1972) is an American drummer, writer and publisher, originally from the Washington, D.C. area who has performed in such influential bands as Bratmobile, the Frumpies, and the PeeChees. She was a pioneer of the early-to-mid '90s riot grrrl movement, penning the zine which coined the phrase in its title. She also co-wrote Girl Germs with Bratmobile singer Allison Wolfe while the two were students at the University of Oregon; that title later became the name of a Bratmobile song.

Career 
Neuman co-owned the now-defunct Berkeley-based Lookout! Records with her ex-husband and former PeeChees singer Chris Appelgren and Cathy Bauer, and in 2006 she started her own independent record label called Simple Social Graces Discos and has released records by Les Aus, Campamento Ñec Ñec, Grabba Grabba Tape, Two Tears, Delorean and Love or Perish. She also founded Indivision Management, and has worked as a manager for such artists as the Locust, Ted Leo and the Donnas.

Neuman currently serves as the Chief Marketing Officer for Downtown (company), the global independent rights management and music services company. She was previously Head of Music for Kickstarter. And, prior to that, she was Director of Label Relations for eMusic, and in 2006 started a band with former PeeChees member Carlos Cañedo called Love or Perish but is no longer in the band.

During high school, Neuman worked for Arizona Representative Mo Udall. In 2009, after graduating from the Chef's Training Program at the Natural Gourmet Institute in New York City, Neuman founded a personal chef, catering and health consulting company focusing on natural and whole foods in Brooklyn called Simple Social Kitchen.

Discography

With Bratmobile 

Studio albums
 Pottymouth (1993) LP/CD/CS (Kill Rock Stars)
 Ladies, Women and Girls (2000) CD/LP, (Lookout! Records)
 Girls Get Busy (2002) CD/LP (Lookout! Records)

EPs
 The Real Janelle (1994) LPEP/CDEP (Kill Rock Stars)

Live albums
 The Peel Session CDEP (Strange Fruit)

Singles
 Kiss & Ride 7-inch (Homestead Records)

Split 7-inch
 Tiger Trap/ Bratmobile split 7-inch (4-Letter Words)
 Heavens to Betsy/ Bratmobile split 7-inch (K Records)
 Brainiac/ Bratmobile split 7-inch (12X12)
 Veronica Lake/ Bratmobile split 7-inch (Simple Machines)

Compilation albums
 Kill Rock Stars compilation, CD/LP, (Kill Rock Stars)
 A Wonderful Treat compilation cassette
 The Embassy Tapes cassette
 Throw compilation CD (Yoyo Recordings)
 International Pop Underground live LP/CD/CS (K Records)
 Neapolitan Metropolitan boxed 7-inch set (Simple Machines)
 Teen Beat 100 compilation 7-inch (Teen Beat)
 Julep compilation LP/CD (Yo Yo)
 Wakefield Vol. 2 V/A CD boxed set (Teen Beat)
 Plea For Peace Take Action compilation CD (Sub City)
 Boys Lie compilation CD (Lookout! Records)
 Yoyo A Go Go 1999 compilation CD (Yoyo Recordings)
 Lookout! Freakout Episode 2 compilation CD (Lookout! Records)
 Songs For Cassavetes compilation CD (Better Looking Records)
 Lookout! Freakout Episode 3 CD (Lookout! Records)
 Turn-On Tune-In Lookout! DVD (Lookout! Records)

With the Frumpies 
On Kill Rock Stars:  
Babies & Bunnies (7-inch EP) KRS213, released 1993-08.
Eunuch Nights (7-inch EP) KRS322, released: 1998-09-23.
Frumpie One-Piece (CD) KRS335, released: 1998-10-23.
Frumpies Forever (7-inch EP) KRS366, released: 2000-08-01.

With the PeeChees 
Albums

Singles and EPs

Non-album tracks

References

External links

Love or Perish! myspace

American women drummers
American rock drummers
American punk rock drummers
American punk rock musicians
Riot grrrl musicians
University of Oregon alumni
American indie rock musicians
Evergreen State College alumni
Indie rock drummers
Living people
1972 births
Bratmobile members
The Frumpies members
The PeeChees members
20th-century American drummers
20th-century American women musicians
21st-century American women musicians
21st-century American drummers
Feminist musicians